The Surinam horned frog (Ceratophrys cornuta), also known as  Amazonian horned frog, is a bulky frog measuring up to  found in the northern part of South America. It has an exceptionally wide mouth, and has horn-like projections above its eyes. Females lay up to 1,000 eggs at a time, and wrap them around aquatic plants. The frog eats other frogs, fish, lizards, and mice. Tadpoles of the Surinam horned frog attack each other (and tadpoles from other species) soon after being hatched. 
This species was once considered the same species as Ceratophrys ornata. This dispute was later settled because the Surinam Horned frog inhabits a different habitat than its smaller cousin and does not interbreed with it in the wild (but will do so in captivity). This species has been known to prey upon the other species of horned frog, especially the northern race of Ceratophrys ornata.

Gallery

References

  Database entry includes a range map and justification for why this species is of least concern
 Animal, Smithsonian Institution, 2005, pg. 445
Ditmar's Reptiles of the World: 1937

External links

Ceratophrys
Amphibians described in 1758
Taxa named by Carl Linnaeus
Amphibians of Brazil
Amphibians of Colombia
Amphibians of Ecuador
Amphibians of French Guiana
Amphibians of Guyana
Amphibians of Peru
Amphibians of Suriname